Sati Savitri is a 1933 Indian Telugu language mythological film directed by C. Pullayya. It was based on a popular stage play of Mylavaram Bala Bharati Samajam. The blockbuster film has received an honorary diploma at the 2nd Venice International Film Festival. The story is about Savitri and Satyavan from Mahabharata. According to the legend, Princess Savitri (Dasari Ramathilakam) marries Prince Satyavan despite a curse that foretells his death within a year. She manages to get Yama (Vemuri Gaggayya), the God of death, to restore her husband to life.

Plot
There was a prince in India named Aswapati, ruling over the kingdom of Madra. He married queen Malavi. Even after a longtime they did not have a child. He invoked Savitri, his favourite deity and by the grace of god, they had a daughter; named as Savitri. She grew into a lovely maiden and was always playing in the palace and in the forest with her companion Vasantika. She often used to relate her dreams to her companion and once she portrayed in words the form and beauty of her beloved.

One day her pet deer escaped into the forest. and both Savitri and Vasantika ran after it. They found that the deer was held and kept in captivity by Prince Satyavanta, son of king Dyumatsena, who was collecting fruits and flowers along with his comrade Saradvata. Savitri then recalled the features of the young man whom she saw in the dream and intimated the fact to her companion. Eventually she got her deer back but could not forget Satyavanta. She made a portrait of her beloved and worshiping him.

Her parents are anxiously contemplating her marriage. Narada visited the kingdom and strongly prevailed upon them to have a matrimonial alliance with Satyavanta. The marriage was celebrated with all religious formalities. Savitri knew through Narada that her husband would not live long. As the destined day was approaching, she was closely watching his movements and accompanying him.

Three days before the fateful moment, she commenced her fast and went into the forest with her Lord where he would hew wood. When the sun reached the zenith, Satyavanta complained of headache and fell down. Within minutes, Yama, the God of death, seated on his Mahisha and relentlessly wrenched the life out of Satyavanta's body.

Seeing Yama depriving her lord's life, she questioned and argued with him about his authority to deal with a lady of spotless chastity and affection. Yama alternately appealed to her and threatened her and even opened up the scenes of hell with its terrors and dire punishments. But nothing daunted, she pursued him, crossed the Vaitarani and compelled him to restore the life of her beloved Satyavanta. Greatly pleased with her wisdom, courage and chastity, he also gave her many a boon which conferred among others progeny to Aswapati and Kingdom to Dyumatsena.

Cast
 Savitri – Ramatilakam
 Satyavanta – Nidumukkala Subbarao
 Aswapati – Govindaraju Venkata Ramayya
 Dyumatsena – Dharmapuri Buchiraju
 Saradvata – Chirravuri Dikshitulu
 Narada – Parupalli Satyanarayana
 Yama – Vemuri Gaggayya
 Malavi – Parvati Bai
 Saibi – Padmavati Bai
 Vasantika – Lalitha

Box office
The film did very well at the box office and became the first Telugu film to collect over 1,00,000 in distributor share.

References

External links
 

Films based on the Mahabharata
1930s Telugu-language films
Indian fantasy drama films
Films based on Indian folklore
Films scored by S. Rajeswara Rao
1933 films
Indian black-and-white films
1930s fantasy drama films
1933 drama films
Films about Savitri and Satyavan
Films directed by C. Pullayya